Happy House of Frightenstein is a Canadian animated television series for preschoolers, which premiered in 2021. A reboot of the 1970s children's series The Hilarious House of Frightenstein, the series focuses on the childhood adventures of five of the original show's main characters as children.

The voice cast includes Luke Dietz as Count Jr., Nendia Lewars as Wolfie (the Wolfman), Addison Chou as Grizz (Grizelda), Brandon St. Bernard as Iggy (Igor), and Anthony Sardinha as Gronk.

The series was produced by Headspinner Productions, and broadcast by Family Jr.

The series received three Canadian Screen Award nominations at the 10th Canadian Screen Awards in 2022, for Best Pre-School Program or Series, Best Writing, Animation (Ken Cuperus and Sandy Jobin-Bevans for "Hide and Go Eek") and Best Original Music, Animation (Peter Chapman for "Wolfie's Last Howl").  The series won the Canadian Screen Award for Best Writing, Animation.

References

External links

2020s Canadian animated television series
2020s Canadian children's television series
2021 Canadian television series debuts
Canadian children's animated horror television series
Canadian preschool education television series
Animated preschool education television series
2020s preschool education television series
Animated television series about children
Family Jr. original programming